The Walther PP (or police pistol) series pistols are blowback-operated semi-automatic pistols, developed by the German arms manufacturer Carl Walther GmbH Sportwaffen.

It features an exposed hammer, a traditional double-action trigger mechanism, a single-column magazine, and a fixed barrel that also acts as the guide rod for the recoil spring. The series includes the Walther PP, PPK, PPK/S, and PPK/E models. The Walther TPH pocket pistol is a smaller calibre pistol introduced in 1971 identical in handling and operation to the PPK.

Various PP series are manufactured in Germany, France and the United States. In the past, the PPK version was manufactured by Walther in its own factory in Germany, as well as under licenses by Manurhin in France; Interarms in Virginia and by Smith & Wesson in Maine. Since 2018, PPK and PPK/S models have been built at the factory of US-based subsidiary Walther Arms, Inc.

The PP and the PPK were among the world's first successful double action semi-automatic pistols. They are still manufactured by Walther and have been widely copied. The design inspired other pistols, among them the Soviet Makarov, the Hungarian FEG PA-63, the Polish P-64, the American Accu-Tek AT-380 II, and the Argentinian Bersa Thunder 380. The PP and PPK were both popular with European police and civilians for being reliable and concealable. During World War II, they were issued to the German military (officers), including the Luftwaffe, as well as the uniformed Ordnungspolizei and plainclothes detectives of the Kriminalpolizei.

PP Series

The original PP was released in 1929. It was designed for police use and was used by police forces in Europe in the 1930s and later. The semi-automatic pistol operated using a simple blowback action. The PP was designed with several safety features, some of them innovative, including an automatic hammer block, a combination safety/decocker and a loaded chamber indicator.

All members of the PP series share a common takedown procedure. The trigger guard is hinged; by pulling the trigger guard downwards, the slide can be drawn backwards past the normal stopping point, lifted clear of the slide rail, and then guided back forward to clear the barrel. With the slide removed the blowback spring around the barrel is free and can be removed as well.

Variants

PPK 
The most common variant is the Walther PPK, a smaller version of the PP with a shorter grip, barrel and frame, and reduced magazine capacity. A new, two-piece wrap-around grip panel construction was used to conceal the exposed back strap. The smaller size made it more concealable than the original PP and hence better suited to plain-clothes or undercover work. It was released in 1931.

"PPK" is an abbreviation for Polizeipistole Kriminal (literally "police pistol criminal"), referring to the Kriminalamt crime investigation office. While the K is often mistakenly assumed to stand for kurz (German for "short"), as the variant has a shorter barrel and frame, Walther used the name "Kriminal" in early advertising brochures and the 1937 GECO German catalog.

The PPK saw widespread use. Adolf Hitler killed himself with his PPK (.32 ACP/7.65mm) in the Führerbunker in Berlin. A Walther PPK .32 (gun number 159270) was used by Kim Jae-gyu to kill South Korean leader Park Chung-hee. A PPK carried by Princess Anne's personal police officer James Beaton infamously jammed during a kidnapping attempt on the princess and her husband.

The fictional secret agent James Bond used a Walther PPK in many of the novels and films: Ian Fleming's choice of Bond's weapon directly influenced the popularity and notoriety of the PPK. Fleming had given Bond a .25 Beretta 418 pistol in early novels, but switched to the PPK in Dr. No (1958) on the advice of firearms expert Geoffrey Boothroyd. Although referred to as a PPK in the film adaption of 1962, the actual gun carried by actor Sean Connery was a Walther PP.

Actor Jack Lord, who played Felix Leiter in Dr. No, was presented with a gold-plated PPK with ivory handgrips, given to him by his friend Elvis Presley. Presley himself owned a silver-finish PPK, inscribed "TCB" ("taking care of business").

PPK/S 
The PPK/S was developed following the enactment of the Gun Control Act of 1968 (GCA68) in the United States, the pistol's largest market. One of the provisions of GCA68 banned the importation of pistols and revolvers not meeting certain requirements of length, weight, and other "sporting" features into the United States. The PPK failed the "Import Points" test of the GCA68 by a single point. Walther addressed this situation by combining the PP's frame with the PPK's barrel and slide to create a pistol that weighed slightly more than the PPK. The additional ounce or two of weight of the PPK/S compared to the PPK was sufficient to provide the extra needed import points.

Because United States law allowed domestic production (as opposed to importation) of the PPK, manufacture began under license in the U.S. in 1983; this version was distributed by Interarms. The version currently manufactured by Walther Arms in Fort Smith, Arkansas has been modified (by Smith & Wesson) by incorporating a longer grip tang (S&W calls it "extended beaver tail"), better protecting the shooter from slide bite, i.e., the rearward-traveling slide's pinching the web between the index finger and thumb of the firing hand, which could be a problem with the original design for people with larger hands or an improper grip, especially when using more powerful cartridge loads. The PPK/S is made of stainless steel. There are also blued examples.

The PPK/S differs from the PPK as follows:
 Overall height:  vs. 100 mm (3.9 in)
 Weight: the PPK/S weighs  more than the PPK
 The PPK/S magazine holds one additional round, in both calibers.

The PPK/S and the PPK are offered in the following calibers: .32 ACP (with capacities of 8 for PPK/S and 7 for PPK); or .380 ACP (PPK/S: 7; PPK: 6). The PPK/S is also offered in .22 LR with capacity of 10 rounds.

PPK-L 

In the 1960s, Walther produced the PPK-L, which was a lightweight variant of the PPK. The PPK-L differed from the standard, all steel PPK in that it had an aluminium alloy frame. These were only chambered in 7.65mm Browning (.32 ACP) and .22 LR because of the increase in felt recoil from the lighter weight of the gun. All other features of the postwar production PPK (brown plastic grips with Walther banner, high polished blue finish, lanyard loop, loaded chamber indicator, 7+1 magazine capacity and overall length) were the same on the PPK-L.

PP Super 
First marketed in 1972, this was an all-steel variant of the PP chambered for the 9×18mm Ultra cartridge. Designed as a police service pistol, it was a blowback operated, double-action pistol with an external slide-stop lever and a firing-pin safety. A manual decocker lever was on the left side of the slide; when pushed down, it locked the firing pin and released the hammer. When the 9×19mm Parabellum was chosen as the standard service round by most of the German police forces, the experimental 9mm Ultra round fell into disuse. Only about 2,000 PP Super pistols were sold to German police forces in the 1970s, and lack of sales caused Walther to withdraw the PP Super from their catalogue in 1979.

L66A1 

In 1974, the British Royal Army Ordnance Corps purchased some thousand .22LR caliber Walther PP pistols for members of the Ulster Defence Regiment. They were issued as sidearms to be carried by off duty soldiers for personal protection during The Troubles. They had military markings unlike standard Walther PPs. They had black plastic grips and were parkerized. In the 1980s, the guns were coated with a lacquer called Suncorite, which was later found to be toxic and is no longer in use.

PPK/E 

At the 2000 Internationale Waffen-Ausstellung (IWA—International Weapons Exhibition) in Nuremberg, Walther announced a new PPK variant designated as the PPK/E. The PPK/E resembles the PPK/S and has a blue steel finish; it is manufactured under license by FEG in Hungary. Despite the resemblance between the two, certain PP-PPK-PPK/S parts, such as magazines, are not interchangeable with the PPK/E. Official factory photographs do not refer to the pistol's Hungarian origins. Instead, the traditional Walther legend ("Carl Walther Waffenfabrik Ulm/Do.") is stamped on the left side of the slide. The PPK/E is offered in .22 LR, .32 ACP, and .380 ACP calibers.

Manufacturing
Walther's original factory was located in Zella-Mehlis in the state of Thuringia. As that part of Germany was occupied by the Soviet Union following World War II, Walther fled to West Germany, where they established a new factory in Ulm. For several years following the war, the Allied powers forbade any manufacture of weapons in Germany. As a result, in 1952, Walther licensed production of the PP series pistols to a French company, Manufacture de Machines du Haut-Rhin, also known as Manurhin. Manurhin made the parts but the pistol was assembled either at Saint-Étienne arsenal (marked "Made in France") or by Walther in Ulm (marked "Made in West Germany" and having German proof-marks). The French company continued to manufacture the PP series until 1986.

In 1978, Ranger Manufacturing of Gadsden, Alabama was licensed to manufacture the PPK and PPK/S; this version was distributed by Interarms of Alexandria, Virginia. Ranger made versions of the PPK/S in both blued and stainless steel and chambered in .380 ACP and only made copies chambered in .32 ACP from 1997 to 1999. This license was eventually canceled in 1999. Walther USA of Springfield, Massachusetts briefly made PPKs and PPK/Ss directly through Black Creek Manufacturing from 1999 to 2001. From 2002, Smith & Wesson (S&W) began manufacturing the PPK and PPK/S under license at their plant in Houlton, Maine until 2013. In February 2009, S&W issued a recall for PPKs it manufactured for a defect in the hammer block safety. In 2018 Walther Arms began producing them again at their new US manufacturing plant in Fort Smith, Arkansas, and new ones are being shipped as of March 2019.

Users

 : PPK variant chambered in .22 Long Rifle and .32 ACP formerly used by police for undercover and surveillance duties. 
 : PPK variant chambered in .32 ACP used by Comandos Anfibios
 : PP variant chambered in .380 ACP adopted by São Paulo Public Force in 1936. PP variant chambered in 7.65 mm issued to high ranking naval officers in 1953
 : PP variant
 : PP variant
 : PP variant
 : PP variant
 : PP variant
 : PPK variant. Danish police used a 7.65mm version until 1998
 : A close copy was produced after World War II
 : All Walther PPs and variants were produced after World War II by Manurhin until 1986
 : PPK variant
 : A close copy was produced locally after World War II. A Hungarian version called the PA-63 (9×18mm Makarov) is still in service
 : PPK variant is used by Komando Pasukan Katak (Kopaska) tactical diver group and Komando Pasukan Khusus (Kopassus) special forces group
 : 200 PPs made via government contract.
 : the PP variant was adopted by the Latvian Police in the early 1930s, becoming its most used pistol until the Soviet occupation. The PP and PPK variants were also privately bought and used by members of the Aizsargi national guard.
 : PP variant
 : PP variant
 : PP variant
 
 : PP variant
 : PPK issued to navy
 : A close copy was produced locally after World War II
 : PP variant
 : PP variant
 : Walther PP in use by Swedish police until early-mid 2000s
 : PP variant
 : A close copy, Kirikkale, in 7.65mm and 9mm was produced locally after World War II.
 :
 MI6 and the Royal Air Force – L66A1 .22 LR and L47A1 7.65mm Walther PP
 : PPK used by MACVSOG recon skydiver team, equipped with detachable suppressor. Produced locally and used by various police forces. Kentucky State Police issued the stainless PPK/S as a backup gun and each pistol had the agency logo engraved on the slide.

See also
 SIG Sauer P230
 Bersa Thunder 380
 FEG PA-63
 List of pistols
 Makarov PM
 Pistol Carpați Md. 1974
 Table of handgun and rifle cartridges
 Type 64 pistol

References

Bibliography

External links

 
 
 
 
 

.22 LR pistols
.32 ACP semi-automatic pistols
.380 ACP semi-automatic pistols
9×18mm Ultra firearms
Weapons and ammunition introduced in 1929
Police weapons
Walther semi-automatic pistols
World War II infantry weapons of Germany
Manurhin